Viscount  was a Japanese samurai of the Bakumatsu period and the 10th (and final) daimyō of Aizu Domain.

Biography
Nobunori was the 19th son of Tokugawa Nariaki of Mito Domain. he was initially named Akinori (昭則), bout received a kanji from his older brother, Shogun Tokugawa Yoshinobu to become "Nobunori".  He was adopted by Matsudaira Katamori in March 1867 as successor to Aizu Domain and received the courtesy title of Wakasa-no-kami and Jijū, and Court rank was Junior Fourth Rank, Lower Grade. In February 1868, Katamori officially retired making Nobunori daimyō.  Following the defeat of Aizu forces at the Battle of Aizu in the Boshin War, the new Meiji government ordered Katamori and Nobunori to Tokyo, where in January 1869 they were stripped of their titles and offices and were placed under "permanent" house arrest. In November 1869, the chieftainship of the Aizu-Matsudaira clan was transferred to Katamori's infant son, Kataharu Matsudaira. In March 1870, Katamori and Nobunori were ordered to accompany the Aizu samurai to their new home of Tanami Domain in far northern Aomori Prefecture. They returned in August 1870 to Tokyo. 

In August 1873, Matsudaira Moriyuki, the 22nd son of Tokugawa Nariaki, former daimyō of Moriyama Domain and imperial governor of Matsukawa, died. Nobuyuki dissolved his adoption tie to Katamori, which allowed him to posthumously be adopted by Moriyuki, becoming the 9th chieftain of the Moriyama-Matsudaira clan. On October 12, 1876 he departed Yokohama for France, where he studied until June 1879. On July 8, 1884, he was ennobled with the title of viscount (shishaku) under the new kazoku peerage system. He died on June 3, 1891 without heir. His title was inherited by Matsudaira Yorihira (1858-1929), the third son of Matsudaira Yoritaka, formerly of Shishido Domain. His grave is at the Yanaka Cemetery in Tokyo.

References
Satō Masanobu 佐藤正信, "Rekidai hanshu oyobi Matsudaira-ke keifu" 歴代藩主および松平家系譜, in Matsudaira Katamori no Subete 松平容保のすべて, ed. Tsunabuchi Kenjō 綱淵謙錠 (Tokyo: Shin Jinbutsu Ōraisha, 1984), pp. 232–243.

1855 births
1891 deaths
Shinpan daimyo
People of the Boshin War
Aizu-Matsudaira clan
Mito-Tokugawa family
Moriyama-Matsudaira clan
Kazoku